Spyridon "Spyros" Mourtos (alternate spellings: Spiridon, Spiros) (born December 5, 1990) is a Greek professional basketball player who last played for Ionikos Nikaias of the Greek Basket League. He is 1.98 m (6'6") tall. He mainly plays at the small forward position, but he can also operate as a point guard and shooting guard.

Professional career
Mourtos began his pro career in 2008, with the Greek League club Aris. He was then loaned to OFI Crete of the semi-pro Greek 3rd Division, for the 2010–11 season, and then loaned to Ikaroi Serron of the Greek 2nd Division for the 2011–12 season. He then returned to Aris for the 2012–13 season. 

He renewed his contract with Aris for 3 more years, after the 2015–16 season ended. He eventually became the team captain of Aris.

After playing for two seasons with Ifaistos Limnou (and captaining the team), Mourtos signed with Larisa on August 25, 2020. On September 17, 2021, Mourtos signed with Ionikos Nikaias, after spending the preseason with them.

National team career
Mourtos was a member of the Greek junior national teams. With the junior national teams of Greece, he won the gold medal at the 2009 FIBA Europe Under-20 Championship, and the silver medal at the 2010 FIBA Europe Under-20 Championship.

Awards and accomplishments

Greek junior national team
2009 FIBA Europe Under-20 Championship: 
2010 FIBA Europe Under-20 Championship:

References

External links
EuroCup Profile
Champions League Profile
FIBA Game Center Profile
FIBA Archive Profile
FIBA Europe Profile
Eurobasket.com Profile
Greek Basket League Profile 
Greek Basket League Profile 
Draftexpress.com Profile

1990 births
Living people
Aris B.C. players
Ifaistos Limnou B.C. players
Ionikos Nikaias B.C. players
Greek men's basketball players
Larisa B.C. players
OFI Crete B.C. players
Shooting guards
Small forwards
People from Phocis
Sportspeople from Central Greece